GRHS may refer to:

Schools 
 George Ranch High School, Fort Bend County, Texas, United States
 Glen Ridge High School, Glen Ridge, New Jersey, United States
 Glen Rock High School, Glen Rock, New Jersey, United States
 Glen Rose High School (Arkansas), Malvern, Arkansas, United States
 Glen Rose High School (Texas), Glen Rose, Texas, United States
 Grand Rapids High School, Grand Rapids, Minnesota, United States